Sonalee Benodekar (née 'Kulkarni; born 18 May 1988) is an Indian actress who mainly acts in Marathi cinema and Bollywood films. After working as a model in her early career, Sonalee made her debut in Kedar Shinde's film Bakula Namdeo Ghotale, for which she received the Zee Gaurav Puraskar award for best actress.

She is noted for her lavani dance song, "Apsara Aali" in the Marathi film Natarang, followed by Kshanbhar Vishranti, Ajintha, and Zapatlela 2. In 2014, she was seen alongside Swapnil Joshi and Prarthana Behere in Mitwaa for which she was nominated at Zee Gaurav Puraskar in the category of Best Actress. She made her Hindi film debut in the adult sex comedy Grand Masti wherein she played the role of Mamta, wife of Ritesh Deshmukh's character. Sonalee also made a cameo appearance in the Ajay Devgan picture Singham 2.

Early life 
Sonalee Kulkarni was born to Manohar and Savinder Kulkarni in the army cantonment of Khadki, near Pune in a Marathi Brahmin family. Her father Manohar Kulkarni is a retired Army doctor. She has studied at Army School, Kendriya Vidyalaya 1 and finished her graduation in mass communication and journalism from Fergusson College, Pune. She also has a post graduation degree in mass communication from Indira School of Communication. Sonalee has a younger brother who owns an event company called Fledgers.

Acting career

Debut and career fluctuations (2006–10) 

The first time Sonalee witnessed a motion picture camera was in FTII, Pune, while doing a small role in a docu-drama. She was then offered the role of a Katthak Dancer in a Marathi daily soap Ha Khel Sanchitacha alongside veteran Marathi actor Vikram Gokhle. On the sets of this TV show, she was offered her first Marathi film, Gadhavach lagn where she did a cameo in a dance number called Indra Darbari, Nache Sundari. Soon after she was offered a lead role in Kedar Shinde's Bakula Namdeo Ghotale. This was her debut film as a lead actress. She received Best Actress for Bakula Namdeo Ghotale at Zee Gaurav 2008 and also Best Actress in a debut film at 45th Maharashtra State Film Awards for Marathi film 2008. Later on she was seen in movies like Hay Kay Nay Kay, Aaba Zindabad, Chal Gaja Karu Maja, Chal Gammat Karu, Gosht Lagnanatrchi. But these movies did not have much success at the box office.

Natrang and beyond (2010–present) 

In 2010, Sonalee was seen in Ravi Jadhav's Natarang. It was a highly successful movie. Sonalee played the role of Nayana Kolhapurkarin, lead dancer of a theater troop. Her dance performances in the film were well received by audiences worldwide. People started calling her "Apsara," referring to her dance on the song "Apsara Ali" in this movie.

After Natarang, Sonalee was seen in the critically acclaimed movie Ajintha, and another multi-star movie Kshanbhar Vishranti alongside Bharat Jadhav, Hemant Dhome, Sachit Patil and Manva Naik. Her next release was Kedar Shinde's Irada Pakka where she played the character of Aadya opposite Siddharth Jadhav. Sonalee was seen next in the drama film S Sasucha opposite Sunil Barve. She ended 2010 with another movie, Samudra where she worked opposite veteran Marathi actor Mohan Agashe.

She had no movies released in 2011. She has also appeared in a comedy show on Zee Marathi "Chala Hawa Yeu Dya".

In 2019, she is appearing in two Marathi films; a historical drama Hirkani and a thriller film Vicky Velingkar. In both films she is performing titular role.

Personal life  
Sonalee married Kunal Benodekar on 7 May 2021 in Dubai.

Filmography

Films

Television

Accolades

References

External links

 
 
 

1988 births
Living people
People from Pune district
Indian film actresses
21st-century Indian actresses
Actresses in Marathi cinema
Kendriya Vidyalaya alumni